Mikko Henrikki Eloranta (born 24 August 1972) is a Finnish former ice hockey player who played with TPS Turku of the SM-Liiga. He represented Finland in both the Olympic Winter Games and the World Cup of Hockey.

Playing career
Eloranta was drafted 247th overall by the Boston Bruins in the 1999 NHL Entry Draft. He played for Boston for two seasons before he was traded by the Bruins, along with Jason Allison, to the Los Angeles Kings for Jozef Stumpel and Glen Murray on 24 October 2001.

He played for the Kings another two seasons. He then returned to Finland, playing for TPS in the Finnish National League.

In 2004, Eloranta played in Switzerland for the Rapperswil-Jona Lakers. Eloranta suffered a major injury in August 2005 during an exhibition game, breaking a bone in his leg, and was not a member of the Silver Medal-winning Finnish Hockey Team at the 2006 Winter Olympics in Turin, Italy.

After three seasons with the Kings, Eloranta signed with the Malmö Redhawks of the Swedish 1st division for the 2007–08 season.  Eloranta then returned to his native Finland, linking up with old club TPS for the 2008–09 season.

Career statistics

Regular season and playoffs

International

References

External links

1972 births
Living people
Boston Bruins draft picks
Boston Bruins players
Finnish ice hockey left wingers
Ice hockey players at the 2002 Winter Olympics
Ilves players
Los Angeles Kings players
Malmö Redhawks players
New York Rangers scouts
Olympic ice hockey players of Finland
People from Aura, Finland
SC Rapperswil-Jona Lakers players
HC TPS players
Sportspeople from Southwest Finland